István Regős (born ) is a well-known Hungarian painter, artist.

Biography
1969-73 – Secondary School for Fine & Applied Arts, Budapest
1973-74 – Hungarian Contractor Company – ornamental paintworks in Budapest: Museum of Fine Art, Mansions on Andrássy Avenue, The Houses of Parliament, Institute for the Blind
1975-80 – Hungarian College of Fine Art, Budapest (today: Hungarian University of Fine Arts) (studies under Lajos Sváby). Diploma in painting.
From 1986 – Member of the Studio of Young Artists, the Society of Hungarian Painters, the Workshop of Graphic Arts in Szentendre, and founding member of the ARTeria Gallery in Szentendre.
From 1973 – Lives and works in Szentendre.
1998 – With his wife, Anna Regős founded the Palmetta Design Gallery in Szentendre.
2013 – Palmetta Design & Textile Art Gallery opens in Budapest.

Selected solo exhibitions 

1985 - Vajda Lajos Studio Gallery, Szentendre
1987 - Childhood, Club of Young Artists, Budapest
1989 – Reform Age, Studio of Young Artists Gallery, Budapest
1992 – Windy Times, Fészek Művészklub, Budapest  Gallery Várfok, Budapest
1994 – Gallery Várfok, Budapest
1995 – Gallery of the Szentendre Art Colony
1996 – Gallery Várfok, Budapest
2000 – ARTéria Gallery, Szentendre
2002 – Gallery Várfok, Budapest
2005 – Szentendre Picture Gallery, Szentendre
2006 – Időutazás, Gallery Várfok, Budapest Raiffeisen Gallery, Budapest
2008 – Bartók 32 Gallery, Budapest
2009 – 20’21 Gallery, Budapest Europ’art, Geneva (CH)
2010 – Gyulai Várszínház Gallery, Gyula Art Fair, Kunsthalle, Budapest
2012 – BTM Budapest Gallery, Budapest

Selected group exhibitions

1983-2002 – Szentendrei Tárlatok
1986-1991 – Stúdiós kiállítások
1988 – Szaft - A V:L:S: és meghívott vendégeinek közös kiállítása, Ernst Múzeum, Budapest
1990 – Hungarian Painting, Ystad, Sweden
1990 – Six Hungarian Artists, Seoul, South-Korea
1990 – Easter-European Painting, De Dolen, Rotterdam, The Netherlands
1991 – Budapest - Contemporary Hungarian Art, Dublin, Írország (IE)
1992 – Kortárs magyar festészeti kiállítás, Experimental Art Foundation, Adelaide, Ausztrália (AU)
1994 – Festival International de la Peinture, Cagnes-sur-Mer, Franciaország (FR)
1995 – Piranesi, Szépművészeti Múzeum, Budapest
1997 – Magyar Szalon, Műcsarnok, Budapest
1997 – Olaj-vászon, Műcsarnok, Budapest
1997 – Budapest 125, Budapest Galéria, Budapest
1999 – Kortárs Magyar Művészet, Europalia Festival, Brüsszel (BE)
2001 – Dialógus, Műcsarnok, Budapest
2001 – A XX. század ujjlenyomata, Budapesti Történeti Múzeum, Budapest
2003 – Metropolisz, Várfok Galéria XO terem, Budapest
2004 – Reflexiók, Várfok Galéria XO terem, Budapest
2005 – ARC poetika, Várfok Galéria XO terem, Budapest
2006 – Az út 1956–2006, Műcsarnok, Budapest
2007 – Akkor és most - válogatás a Fiatal Képzőművészek Stúdiójának archívumából, Millenáris Teátrum, Budapest
2008 – Kép a képben, Várfok Galéria, Budapest
2009 – Tolerance In Art - szlovák és magyar művészek kiállítása, Danubiana, Szlovákia (SK)
2010 – 11 év - Válogatás a Ferenczy Múzeum új szerzeményeiből, Szentendrei Képtár
2010 – Hommage á Puskás Öcsi, Hotel Boscolo, New York Palota, Budapest
2010 – Kapcsolat 2010, Kecskemét, Nagybánya
2010 – Különleges, MeMoArt Galéria, Budapest
2011 – Hommage á Liszt Ferenc, Eötvös 10 Kulturális Színtér, Budapest
2011 – ART MARKET Budapest, Millenáris
2011 – Hungart Ösztöndíj beszámoló kiállítás, Olof Palme-ház, Budapest
2011 – Lineart, Gent, Belgium (BE)
2012 – ART PARIS Art Fair, Grand Palais, Paris (FR)
2013 – ARTPLACC, Tihany
2014 – ARTPLACC, Tihany
2014 – Hungaricons - Kárpáti Collection, Várkert Bazár, Budapest
2014 – Ein blicke - Künstler aus Szentendre, Atelier Schwab, Wertheim am Main, Germany (DE)
2015 – Here and Now - Fine arts. National Salon 2015. Hall of Art, Budapest

Awards, scholarships 
 1986, 1988 – Awards of the Studio of Young Artists
 1988-1990 – Szőnyi-scholarship
 1991 – I. Grotesque Competition - Main Prize
 1992 – Repülés-szárnyalás exhibition - Main Prize
 1992 – Scholarship of the City of Salzburg
 1996 – Scholarship of the City of Salzburg 
 2004 – Munkácsy Mihály-díj
 2010 – Hungart Scholarship

Artworks in private and public collections (selection) 
 Ferenczy Museum, Szentendre (HU)
 Memorial Museum of István Széchenyi, Nagycenk (HU)
 Tragor Ignác Museum, Vác (HU)
 Collection of László Károly, Basel (CH)
 Collection of László Károly, Veszprém (HU)
 Galerie Bartha, Basel (CH)
 Graphisoft Park Collection, Budapest (HU)
 Budapest Bank Collection, Budapest (HU)
 Raiffeissen Bank Collection, Budapest (HU)

External links 
 www.regos.co.hu - Official site of István Regős
 István Regős on Artportal

Hungarian painters
1954 births
Living people